Eucalyptus leptophylla, commonly known as the March mallee, slender-leaved red mallee or narrow-leaved red mallee, is a species of mallee that is endemic to inland Australia. It has smooth greyish bark, linear to narrow lance-shaped, oblong or curved adult leaves, flower buds in groups of between seven and thirteen, creamy white flowers and cup-shaped, barrel-shaped or hemispherical fruit.

Description
It has smooth, grey, to cream or coppery bark that is shed in short ribbons or long strips, sometimes persistent on the lower trunk.

Taxonomy
Eucalyptus leptophylla was first formally described in 1856 by the botanist Friedrich Anton Wilhelm Miquel from an unpublished description by Ferdinand von Mueller of a specimen collected by Hans Hermann Behr. The description was published in a paper entitled Stirpes Novo-Hollandas a Ferd Mullero collectas determinavit in the journal Nederlandsch kruidkundig archief.

The specific epithet (leptophylla) is derived from the ancient Greek words leptos (λεπτός), meaning "thin" or "slender" and phyllon (φύλλον),  meaning "leaf".

The name Eucalyptus foecunda is often misapplied to this species, but E. foecunda only occurs in coastal areas of south-western Western Australia and has rougher bark.

Distribution
Eucalyptus leptophylla is found in low woodland a mallee scrubland growing in white, yellow or red sand or red-brown loam over gravel or granite. It is also found on rises, sometimes around salt lakes, on sand plains and near granite outcrops. It is distributed through southern Wheatbelt and Goldfields-Esperance regions of Western Australia, through south-eastern South Australia, Victoria and in New South Wales from Wilcannia to West Wyalong.

Use in horticulture
E. leptophylla is sold commercially in seed form or as seedlings. It grows at a moderate rate, prefers a full sun position and will grow in sandy and alkaline soils.
The plant is suitable as an ornamental tree, and also makes a good screen or windbreak. It will attract pollinating birds and is drought resistant.

See also
List of Eucalyptus species

References

leptophylla
Myrtales of Australia
Flora of New South Wales
Flora of South Australia
Flora of Victoria (Australia)
Eucalypts of Western Australia
Plants described in 1856
Taxa named by Ferdinand von Mueller